St. Anne's Church, in Biała Podlaska, Poland is a Baroque Roman Catholic church. It was originally built in 1572, on the site of an earlier shrine, as a Protestant church dedicated to the Arianism doctrine. The Protestants were expelled in 1596 by Mikołaj Krzysztof "the Orphan" Radziwiłł. Between 1597 and 1603 it was rebuilt as a Catholic church, being dedicated to Saint Anne in 1603. The church is built in the shape of a Latin cross.

In a Flèche Katarzyna Sobieska, the sister of King of Poland and wife propraetor of Biała Michał Kazimierz Radziwiłł, installed Crescent under a cross in memory Battle of Vienna.

Near to the church there can also be found:
 Wooden vicar house "Wikarówka" of the  18th century with a roof made of shingle
 Bell tower of 1765
 Presbytery of 1750, a wooden building line with bricks in 1803 year.

Buildings and structures in Lublin Voivodeship
Biała Podlaska
Biała Podlaska
17th-century Roman Catholic church buildings in Poland
Roman Catholic churches completed in 1603
1572 establishments in the Polish–Lithuanian Commonwealth
Buildings and structures in the Polish–Lithuanian Commonwealth